Stephen Anderson (born 1958) is a former Australian international lawn bowler.

Bowls career
In the 1996 World Outdoor Bowls Championship he won two bronze medals in the triples and fours.

He also won a silver medal in the fours with Ian Taylor, Robert Ball and Steve Srhoy at the 1994 Commonwealth Games in Victoria.

He won four medals at the 1993 and 1995 Asia Pacific Bowls Championships including double gold in the triples and fours, in Victoria, Canada.

References

1958 births
Australian male bowls players
Living people
Commonwealth Games medallists in lawn bowls
Commonwealth Games silver medallists for Australia
Bowls players at the 1994 Commonwealth Games
Medallists at the 1994 Commonwealth Games